Orville Willis Forte IV (born June 17, 1970) is an American actor, comedian, writer, and producer. Forte was a cast member on the NBC sketch comedy series Saturday Night Live for eight
seasons between 2002 and 2010. During his time on the show, he became known for playing a recurring character that led to a feature film adaptation, MacGruber (2010), and a streaming television series, MacGruber, which he has starred in since 2021. Outside of SNL, Forte is also known for creating and starring in the sitcom The Last Man on Earth (2015–2018). For the series, he received three Primetime Emmy Award nominations: two for acting and one for writing.

After obtaining a history degree from the University of California, Los Angeles and becoming a financial broker like his father, Forte changed his career path to comedy and took classes with the improv group The Groundlings. He worked as a writer and producer on " 3rd Rock from the Sun" and That '70s Show before joining Saturday Night Live. Forte played various roles in comedy films before starring in the drama film Nebraska (2013). He has provided voice-work for Cloudy with a Chance of Meatballs films (2009–2013), My Life as a Courgette, Get Squirrely (2016), Luis & the Aliens (2018), The Willoughbys, and Scoob! (2020), also voicing Eddy in Disney XD's Lab Rats, and Abraham Lincoln in Clone High (2002-2003) and The Lego Movie films (2014–2019), Michelangelo and Lincoln: History Cops (2014), and America: The Motion Picture (2021).

Early life
Orville Willis Forte IV was born in Alameda, California, on June 17, 1970, the son of artist and former schoolteacher Patricia C. (née Stivers) and financial broker Orville Willis "Reb" Forte III. He was raised in Moraga before moving to Lafayette at age 13. He went by "Billy" in his early years until he was teased at school for it also being a girl's name, at which point he decided he would from then on be known as "Will". Forte describes himself as having been a "really happy little boy" whose parents were "wonderful" and created a "very loving environment". He was interested in comedy from a young age, growing up idolizing comedians Peter Sellers, David Letterman, and Steve Martin, as well as the sketch-comedy television series Saturday Night Live. He often pulled pranks on his parents, and would record himself performing imaginary radio shows. He did not aim to be a comedian, however, and initially wanted to become a football player.

Forte was "a laid-back teen with a lot of friends" and a member of the varsity football and swim teams at Acalanes High School, from which he graduated in 1988. He was voted "Best Personality" by his graduating class and served as freshman class president. He had no ambitions for a television or film career, though his mother noticed a "creative streak" in him. Following high school, he attended the University of California, Los Angeles, where he was a member of the Lambda Chi Alpha fraternity and completed a degree in history. Planning to follow his father, he became a financial broker at Smith Barney Shearson in Beverly Hills, but felt "miserable" there. He co-wrote a feature-length script while there, and later said that he discovered he loved writing "more than anything [he] had ever done in [his] life". He had been encouraged to attempt comedy during his years at university, and he decided to change his career path to do so.

Career

Forte began taking classes at the Groundlings in Los Angeles, an improvisational and sketch comedy troupe and school, while tutoring children to make ends meet. Forte's first successful foray into comedy was 101 Things to Definitely Not Do If You Want to Get a Chick, a comic book he produced about incompetent men. The comics landed him his first professional job writing for The Jenny McCarthy Show, a short-lived variety show starring Jenny McCarthy. Shortly thereafter, he was asked to submit a packet to the Late Show with David Letterman and was told Letterman responded favorably to animation. After only nine months at Letterman, he was "let go" from the job. He recalled his stint on the program as unpleasant, noting that he did not have enough experience in writing. "What an honor to work at that show but I don't think I was fully mentally prepared. [...] I always wonder what it would be like if I’d had a couple more years of experience before going there."

Forte returned to Los Angeles and began performing with the Groundlings' Main Company, with Cheryl Hines, Jim Rash and Maya Rudolph. He tried stand-up comedy three times, mostly at open mic nights, but quit after being voted into the Main Company. He joined the writing teams of two failed sitcoms, including The Army Show and Action. Forte got jobs writing for 3rd Rock from the Sun and That '70s Show. He loved writing and had mostly given up on acting, aside from acting with the Groundlings. While performing with the troupe in 2001, he was spotted by Lorne Michaels, the creator of Saturday Night Live (SNL). Forte felt his confidence was higher than usual, as That '70s Show had been picked up for two more years. He was invited to audition for SNL, which he regarded as unexpected.

At his audition for SNL, he performed multiple original characters, including Tim Calhoun, a speed reader, a prison guard, in addition to impressions of singer Michael McDonald and actor Martin Sheen. His final character was an older piece from his days with the Groundlings, in which he portrays a gold-painted street performer who performs fellatio to pay for his face paint, which devolves into a song needlessly uttering the words "cock" and "face paint" dozens of times. He felt his time to shine as a performer was already over, as he was in his thirties when he auditioned. To his surprise, he was offered a chance to be on the show, but declined, opting instead for the financial stability of his work at That '70s Show. He felt working for SNL could not live up to the idealized version he had dreamed of, but he later realized he would be making a mistake.

After Will Ferrell left Saturday Night Live the following spring, Forte joined the cast, premiering at the beginning of the show's twenty-eighth season in the fall. He was promoted to repertory player after his first year. His early years on the program were characterized by stage fright and an inability to properly interpret sketches that he did not write himself. He had to "re-learn" how to perform after years as a writer, and later felt his natural tendency to "overthink" things improved his performance. He was particularly uncomfortable portraying President George W. Bush, as he felt he was not the best impressionist and it paled in comparison to Ferrell's impersonation of Bush. His only role was often Bush, leaving him no chance for more "absurd" pieces he favored. He was nearly fired from the program following his third season (2004–05), but after two three-week extensions to decide his fate, he was brought back. Forte estimated it took five seasons for him to feel fully comfortable performing on the show. He made his film debut in Around the World in 80 Days.

Forte's humor at SNL has been described as bizarre, and he became known for many "10-to-1" sketchespieces that were considered odd, placed at the very end of the show. Among these were a sketch titled "Potato Chip", in which Forte plays a NASA recruiter who warns a candidate (Jason Sudeikis) not to touch a bowl of potato chips on his desk, or his turn as Jeff Montgomery, a sex offender who dresses up as a sex offender for Halloween. He was also well known for his characters Tim Calhoun, Greg Stink, and the Falconer. Forte's favorite sketch on the show was one in which he played a motivational coach alongside football star Peyton Manning. He also co-starred with Andy Samberg in the first SNL Digital Short, "Lettuce". He often spent long hours crafting his sketches for the program, missing deadlines, but his pieces were often greeted warmly at table reads. During his time at the show, he co-starred in and wrote the 2007 film The Brothers Solomon. The film was originally a pilot for Carsey-Werner, and its creation was an extension of his agreement to terminate his contract to appear on SNL.

Forte's best-known character on SNL was MacGruber, a special operations agent who is tasked in each episode with deactivating a ticking bomb but becomes distracted by personal issues. The sketches were based on the television series MacGyver. It was created by writer Jorma Taccone, who pitched the idea relentlessly to Forte. He was initially reluctant to commit to the sketch, deeming it too dumb, but accepted after persuasion from Taccone. The first sketch aired in January 2007, and led to multiple more segments in the following years. In 2009, the sketches were spun off into a series of commercials sponsored by Pepsi premiering during Super Bowl XLIII that featured the actor behind MacGyver, Richard Dean Anderson, as MacGruber's father. The advertisements led the character and sketches to receive a wider level of popularity. Following the success of the advertisements, creator Lorne Michaels approached Forte, Taccone, and writer John Solomon with the idea to produce a MacGruber film.

Regarding his experiences on SNL, Forte remarked, "Looking back, the experience is something I'll never forget. I still miss it, and I'll always miss it. That's my family." His celebrity impressions included George W. Bush, Tom DeLay, John Edwards, Timothy Geithner, Newt Gingrich, Chad Lowe, Zell Miller, David Petraeus, Harry Reid, Brian Williams and Hu Jintao.

In the summer of 2009, MacGruber was shot on a tight schedule for four weeks in Albuquerque, New Mexico. It was written while simultaneously producing the weekly episode of SNL, and the show's production process left the trio deprived of sleep. Forte was positive regarding the film, saying,  The film was released in May 2010 and received mixed reviews. It fared worse at the box office, where it failed to recoup its budget and was pulled from theaters after its third week. Forte found the failure tolerable, commenting, "When you make something that you’re really proud of and it doesn’t do well, you can live with it." The film has since seen more positive reception and has been dubbed a cult classic.

Forte left Saturday Night Live shortly before the beginning of the show's thirty-sixth season in 2010. He felt it the "right time to go," considering his eight-year tenure there, his expansion into film with MacGruber, and his age. In addition, his sister had just had children and he wanted to move to the West Coast to be closer to them. He soon regretted the decision, calling the following year an "emotionally trying period," as he felt "devastated" that he would no longer be on the program. He assumed his shot at a film career was ruined, and he imagined that if acting did not work out, he would return to writing primarily. Following this, he entered what he has called a "lost period" and had small supporting roles, such as Rock of Ages, That's My Boy and The Watch, all of which were not successful.  The only commercial successful film he worked on was Grown Ups 2, where he made a cameo as a male cheerleader.  He also took a role as Paul L'astnamé, the cross-dressing boyfriend of Jenna Maroney on the critically acclaimed sitcom 30 Rock.

Forte took his first dramatic role for the 2013 film Run & Jump. Director Steph Green offered him the part, and Forte imagined it a "fun thing to try," though he noted that she had more confidence in him than he had himself. Later, he sent an audition tape to Alexander Payne for a role in his next film, Nebraska. He equated his casting in the film to his fear of joining SNL a decade prior, noting that he was "terrified" to begin working on it. He felt scared initially, but followed Bruce Dern's acting advice to "look for the truth" in each scene—in other words, "In every scene, you're just trying to play it as honestly and as real as you can."

Forte began work on The Last Man on Earth, a sitcom, with longtime collaborators Phil Lord and Christopher Miller in 2013. Though it was the duo's idea, Forte attached himself to the concept, crafting a treatment over a weekend. The series was pitched around Hollywood to positive responses and was picked up in 2014 by Fox. Forte serves as the series' creator, a writer, the lead role, and showrunner for the first season. He felt odd being in charge of its writing team (composed of longtime friends), and awkward at delegating tasks, so much so that he would end up doing the work himself. Being a showrunner "truly was an amount of work I never knew existed," he said, which involved him working a "minimum of 12 hours" daily. The series premiered in 2015 to positive responses, and was renewed for the next three seasons.

In 2016, Forte played Hulka, a low-level weed dealer, in the comedy Keanu, starring Jordan Peele and Keegan-Michael Key. In 2018, he starred as National Lampoon magazine co-founder and writer Doug Kenney in the Netflix biographical film A Futile and Stupid Gesture. The film was directed by David Wain and also features Domhnall Gleeson as co-founder Henry Beard. Forte voiced Shaggy Rogers in the Scooby-Doo film Scoob!.

In 2021, Forte starred in Sweet Tooth, reprised his role as MacGruber in a TV series on Peacock, and began voicing Wolf Tobin in the animated sitcom The Great North. In 2022, It was announced that Forte will voiced the lead role as Coach Dan in Disney and Pixar’s first full length upcoming series Win or lose which will be on Disney+ in late 2023.

Other work
Forte is a supporter of the camp Wampler's Kids and recorded a promotional piece at SNL with Will Ferrell. Forte was a childhood friend of founder Steven Wampler and previously the national spokesman for SciEyes, a non-profit organization created to support research, training and public education in stem cell biology and to further the field by recognizing and supporting its potential for creating new therapies for the treatment of blinding and debilitating eye diseases. He was a primary donor towards the establishment of a research fellowship for third-year medical students at Duke Medical Center. He serves on the board of directors of the National Policy and Advocacy Council on Homelessness.

Personal life
Forte resides in Santa Monica, California. He purchased his home there just two weeks before joining the cast of Saturday Night Live, which required him to move to New York City, and later admitted that "it was not the greatest timing". He dated his Last Man on Earth co-star January Jones in 2015. In 2019, he became engaged to Olivia Modling, whom he met in 2018. They have a daughter, born in February 2021. He and Modling married on July 31, 2021.

Forte's mother has visited every film set on which he has worked and made an appearance on a Mother's Day episode of SNL, in which he sang a song to her on Weekend Update. He also officiated his sister Michelle's wedding and filmed the birth of his niece and nephew.

Forte has discussed and joked about his OCD tendencies. He recounted listening to only one song in his office at SNL for an entire year because he wanted to challenge himself. During an interview with Larry King, he discussed his OCD as a challenge he had to overcome but not one he wished he did not have, as it is a part of his personality. In a February 2015 feature on him and his show The Last Man on Earth, the writer of the article said that Forte mentioned OCD often but it was not clear if he had ever been formally diagnosed, though Forte related how he and a former girlfriend had gone through an OCD questionnaire and it concluded that Forte "should immediately talk to someone about this".

Filmography

Film

Television

Music videos

Video games

Web

Crew work

Awards and nominations

References

Bibliography

External links

 
 Will Forte LiveJournal Community
 Will Forte shares his favorite NY places at ontheinside.info
 Interview with Will Forte at CollegeHumor
 

1970 births
Living people
20th-century American comedians
20th-century American male actors
21st-century American comedians
21st-century American male actors
American impressionists (entertainers)
American male comedians
American male film actors
American male screenwriters
American male television actors
American male television writers
American male voice actors
American sketch comedians
American television writers
Comedians from California
Male actors from the San Francisco Bay Area
People from Alameda, California
People from Lafayette, California
People from Moraga, California
Screenwriters from California
University of California, Los Angeles alumni